Plumstead railway station serves the suburb of Plumstead, in the Royal Borough of Greenwich, east of Woolwich Arsenal. It is served by Southeastern.

Plumstead is on the North Kent Line and was opened 10 years after the line opened on 16 July 1859. The platforms are below road level: the gabled station buildings stand on an overbridge at the country end. At this point, there are sidings: the station used to be where the railway system operating within the Royal Arsenal joined the main line.

There were plans for the Docklands Light Railway to be extended to Plumstead Railway Station. However, Woolwich Arsenal station was chosen instead.

The station is served by local bus routes 53, 96, 99, 122, 177, 180, 244, 301, 380, 422, 469, 472, 672 & N1.

The station is located at the western end of the Ridgeway pedestrian and cycle path.

Plans are currently being drawn up for the installation of lifts and other accessibility improvements to the station as part of the UK Department of Transport's Access for All Programme.

Services

The typical off-peak service in trains per hour is:
 4 tph to London Cannon Street (2 of these run via  and 2 run via )
 2 tph to  via Greenwich 
 2 tph to 
 2 tph to  via 

During the peak hours, the station is served by an additional half-hourly circular service to and from London Cannon Street via  and Lewisham in the clockwise direction and via Greenwich in the anticlockwise direction.

References

External links

Railway stations in the Royal Borough of Greenwich
Former South Eastern Railway (UK) stations
Railway stations in Great Britain opened in 1859
Railway stations served by Southeastern
Railway stations served by Govia Thameslink Railway